The Hispaniolan parakeet (Psittacara chloropterus) (Spanish: perico or periquito), colloquially known as xaxabí, is a species of parrot in the family Psittacidae that is endemic to the island of Hispaniola (split between the Dominican Republic and Haiti).

Description 
It is a medium-sized parakeet, evenly colored green, with a long, pointed tail, pale beak and legs, white eye-ring, and red patch on the wing's wrist area. The sexes are identical; the bird is highly gregarious, forming flocks which can surpass several dozen individuals. The only similar bird in its native range is the possibly introduced olive-throated parakeet, from which it can be readily differentiated, mainly by wing patches that are blue, instead of red.

Habitat 
Its natural habitats are subtropical or tropical dry forest, subtropical or tropical moist lowland forest, subtropical or tropical moist montane forest, and arable land; nonetheless, there are populations that live in urban areas, like the ever-increasing one in Santo Domingo, in the Dominican Republic.

Conservation
It is much more common in the Dominican Republic than in Haiti, where loss of habitat and persecution for the pet trade has made it rare. It is also persecuted in both countries as a crop-pest.

Taxonomy
The  Puerto Rican parakeet (Psittacara maugei) was previously found on Mona Island, but became extinct circa 1882. It was considered a subspecies of the Hispaniolan parakeet before being considered as a distinct species.

References

External links
Species factsheet - BirdLife International
Estudio de Aves Dominicanas Comunes 
Videos and photos - Internet Bird Collection

Hispaniolan parakeet
Endemic birds of the Caribbean
Endemic birds of Hispaniola
Birds of Hispaniola
Birds of the Dominican Republic
Birds of Haiti
Species endangered by the pet trade
Hispaniolan parakeet
Hispaniolan parakeet
Taxonomy articles created by Polbot